Leonard Pietraszak (6 November 1936 – 1 February 2023) was a Polish actor. He appeared in more than 70 films and television shows since 1957.

Life and career
Pietraszak was best known for playing Gustaw Kramer in popular comedy Vabank and its sequel.

Pietraszak died on 1 February 2023, at the age of 86.

Selected filmography
 Stawka większa niż życie (1967)
 How I Unleashed World War II (1970)
 Gniazdo (1974) – Siegfried I the Older, Count of Walbeck
 Czterdziestolatek (1974–1977) – doctor
 Vabank (1981) – Gustaw Kramer
 Danton (1983) – Lazare Carnot
 Vabank II (1984) – Gustaw Kramer
 Kingsajz (1987)
 Letters to Santa (2011)

References

External links

1936 births
2023 deaths
Polish male film actors
20th-century Polish male actors
21st-century Polish male actors
Łódź Film School alumni
Actors from Bydgoszcz
Recipient of the Meritorious Activist of Culture badge
Recipients of the Gold Medal for Merit to Culture – Gloria Artis